Rhaphuma is a genus of typical longhorn beetles in the family Cerambycidae. There are more than 200 described species in Rhaphuma.

Species
These 220 species belong to Rhaphuma.

 Rhaphuma acrocarpi Gardner, 1940
 Rhaphuma aequalis Holzschuh, 1991
 Rhaphuma afflata Holzschuh, 1983
 Rhaphuma albicolon Holzschuh, 2006
 Rhaphuma albonotata Pic, 1915
 Rhaphuma albosignata Pic, 1943
 Rhaphuma amamiensis Hayashi, 1983
 Rhaphuma angustata (Pic, 1920)
 Rhaphuma anongi Gressitt & Rondon, 1970
 Rhaphuma anopla Holzschuh, 1983
 Rhaphuma aperta Gressitt, 1951
 Rhaphuma aranea Holzschuh, 1984
 Rhaphuma argentogrisea Dauber, 2003
 Rhaphuma atrata Fisher, 1935
 Rhaphuma atrosignata Pic, 1925
 Rhaphuma baibarae Matsushita, 1931
 Rhaphuma barbouri Gressitt, 1959
 Rhaphuma barriesi Dauber, 2002
 Rhaphuma bhaktai Holzschuh, 1983
 Rhaphuma bicolor Pic, 1927
 Rhaphuma bicolorifemoralis Gressitt & Rondon, 1970
 Rhaphuma bimaculata Schwarzer, 1931
 Rhaphuma binhensis (Pic, 1922)
 Rhaphuma binotata Hua, 1989
 Rhaphuma bivittata Aurivillius, 1916
 Rhaphuma brevivittata (Aurivillius, 1922)
 Rhaphuma brigittae Holzschuh, 1991
 Rhaphuma brodskyi Holzschuh, 1992
 Rhaphuma bucseki Viktora, 2014
 Rhaphuma campanulifera Aurivillius, 1922
 Rhaphuma chatterjeei Gardner, 1940
 Rhaphuma chewi Dauber, 2003
 Rhaphuma circumscripta (Schwarzer, 1925)
 Rhaphuma clarina Gressitt & Rondon, 1970
 Rhaphuma clermonti Pic, 1927
 Rhaphuma comosella Holzschuh, 2006
 Rhaphuma conformis (Gahan, 1906)
 Rhaphuma connexa Aurivillius, 1922
 Rhaphuma consona Holzschuh, 1991
 Rhaphuma constricta Gressitt & Rondon, 1970
 Rhaphuma contiguaria Holzschuh, 2009
 Rhaphuma decora Holzschuh, 1995
 Rhaphuma delicata Kano, 1933
 Rhaphuma desaii Gardner, 1940
 Rhaphuma diana Gahan, 1906
 Rhaphuma diminuta (Bates, 1873)
 Rhaphuma disconotata (Pic, 1908)
 Rhaphuma diversevittata Pic, 1943
 Rhaphuma diversipennis Pic, 1920
 Rhaphuma duplex Holzschuh, 1991
 Rhaphuma elegantula Gahan, 1906
 Rhaphuma eleodina Gressitt & Rondon, 1970
 Rhaphuma elongata Gressitt, 1940
 Rhaphuma encausta Holzschuh, 1991
 Rhaphuma excisa Holzschuh, 1992
 Rhaphuma falx Holzschuh, 1991
 Rhaphuma farinosula Holzschuh, 2003
 Rhaphuma floresica Viktora, 2014
 Rhaphuma frustrata Holzschuh, 1993
 Rhaphuma fucosa Holzschuh, 2007
 Rhaphuma fulgurata Gahan, 1906
 Rhaphuma gilvitarsis Holzschuh, 1992
 Rhaphuma gracilipes (Faldermann, 1835)
 Rhaphuma grisescens Pic, 1929
 Rhaphuma herminae Holzschuh, 1984
 Rhaphuma histrio (Chevrolat, 1863)
 Rhaphuma horsfieldii (White, 1855)
 Rhaphuma illicata Holzschuh, 1991
 Rhaphuma ilsae Holzschuh, 1983
 Rhaphuma impressiceps Pic, 1943
 Rhaphuma improba Holzschuh, 1992
 Rhaphuma improvisa Holzschuh, 1991
 Rhaphuma incarinata Pic, 1925
 Rhaphuma indifferens Holzschuh, 1992
 Rhaphuma innotata Pic, 1927
 Rhaphuma insignaticollis Pic, 1937
 Rhaphuma interrupta Pic, 1925
 Rhaphuma inusta Holzschuh, 1991
 Rhaphuma joshii Holzschuh, 1984
 Rhaphuma klapperichi Tippmann, 1955
 Rhaphuma krali Holzschuh, 1992
 Rhaphuma lanzhui Holzschuh, 1991
 Rhaphuma laosica Gressitt & Rondon, 1970
 Rhaphuma lubricula Holzschuh, 2003
 Rhaphuma lutarella Holzschuh, 2003
 Rhaphuma luteopubens Pic, 1937
 Rhaphuma maceki Holzschuh, 1992
 Rhaphuma maculata Schwarzer, 1931
 Rhaphuma maculicollis Gressitt & Rondon, 1970
 Rhaphuma manipurensis Gahan, 1906
 Rhaphuma marialaurae Gouverneur, 2015
 Rhaphuma mekonga Gressitt & Rondon, 1970
 Rhaphuma minima Gressitt & Rondon, 1970
 Rhaphuma minuta Pic, 1943
 Rhaphuma moerens Holzschuh, 1983
 Rhaphuma mucosa Holzschuh, 2003
 Rhaphuma mushana Matsushita, 1936
 Rhaphuma nigripes Jordan, 1894
 Rhaphuma nigrocincta Matsushita, 1931
 Rhaphuma nigrolineata Pic, 1915
 Rhaphuma nishidai Hayashi & Makihara, 1981
 Rhaphuma ogatai Mitono, 1942
 Rhaphuma pacholatkoi Viktora, 2014
 Rhaphuma patkaina Gahan, 1906
 Rhaphuma paucis Holzschuh, 1992
 Rhaphuma phiale Gahan, 1906
 Rhaphuma pictiventris Gressitt, 1939
 Rhaphuma pieli Gressitt, 1940
 Rhaphuma pingana Pic, 1926
 Rhaphuma placida Pascoe, 1858
 Rhaphuma praeusta Lameere, 1890
 Rhaphuma pseudobinhensis Gressitt & Rondon, 1970
 Rhaphuma pseudominuta Gressitt & Rondon, 1970
 Rhaphuma puncticollis Holzschuh, 1992
 Rhaphuma quadricolor (Castelnau & Gory, 1841)
 Rhaphuma quadrimaculata Pic, 1923
 Rhaphuma querciphaga Holzschuh, 1984
 Rhaphuma quercus Gardner, 1940
 Rhaphuma quinquenotata Chevrolat, 1863
 Rhaphuma quintini Gressitt & Rondon, 1970
 Rhaphuma rassei Dauber, 2002
 Rhaphuma reticulata (Jordan, 1894)
 Rhaphuma retrofasciata Dauber, 2004
 Rhaphuma rhea Gahan, 1906
 Rhaphuma rubromaculata Dauber, 2006
 Rhaphuma ruficollis Mitono, 1942
 Rhaphuma rufobasalis Pic, 1924
 Rhaphuma rybniceki Holzschuh, 1992
 Rhaphuma sabahensis Dauber, 2006
 Rhaphuma salemensis Gardner, 1940
 Rhaphuma semiclathrata (Chevrolat, 1863)
 Rhaphuma sexnotata Chevrolat, 1863
 Rhaphuma sharmai Holzschuh, 1990
 Rhaphuma shelfordi Dauber, 2008
 Rhaphuma signata (Gahan, 1907)
 Rhaphuma steinkae Holzschuh, 1991
 Rhaphuma strnadi Holzschuh, 1992
 Rhaphuma subvarimaculata Gressitt & Rondon, 1970
 Rhaphuma sulphurea Gressitt, 1941
 Rhaphuma superba Dauber, 2002
 Rhaphuma suthra Gardner, 1940
 Rhaphuma suturalis Gahan, 1906
 Rhaphuma tenerrima Holzschuh, 1991
 Rhaphuma tenuigrisea Dauber, 2003
 Rhaphuma teres Holzschuh, 1989
 Rhaphuma tertia Holzschuh, 1991
 Rhaphuma testaceiceps Pic, 1915
 Rhaphuma testaceicolor Pic, 1920
 Rhaphuma theryi (Pic, 1900)
 Rhaphuma timorica Viktora, 2014
 Rhaphuma torrida Holzschuh, 1991
 Rhaphuma tricolor Gressitt & Rondon, 1970
 Rhaphuma trimaculata Chevrolat, 1863
 Rhaphuma trinalba Gahan, 1906
 Rhaphuma trinotata Pic, 1923
 Rhaphuma unigena Holzschuh, 1993
 Rhaphuma ustulatula Holzschuh, 2006
 Rhaphuma vagesignata Pic, 1937
 Rhaphuma virens Matsushita, 1931
 Rhaphuma vittata (Gahan, 1907)
 Rhaphuma weigeli Holzschuh, 2003
 Rhaphuma wiedemanni (Castelnau & Gory, 1841)
 Rhaphuma xenisca (Bates, 1884)

References

Clytini
Cerambycinae
Cerambycidae genera